Kekkonen's third cabinet was the 35th government of Finland. The majority government lasted from 20 September 1951 to 9 August 1953. The cabinet’s Prime Minister was Urho Kekkonen.

Ministers

References

Kekkonen, 3
1951 establishments in Finland
1953 disestablishments in Finland
Cabinets established in 1951
Cabinets disestablished in 1953
Cabinet 3